Ayask (also Romanized as Āysak; also known as Ayāz and Aiāz) is a city in the Central District of Sarayan County, South Khorasan Province, Iran. At the 2016 census, its population was 5,143, in 1,639 families.

References 

Populated places in Sarayan County

Cities in South Khorasan Province